Crwn Thy Frnicatr is Psyclon Nine's third studio album, released on October 23, 2006 by US label, Metropolis Records, and on November 10, 2006 by German label, NoiTekk. On the cover of the album, are the words "All those who stand before me shall be judged."

Track listing
 "Bellum in Abyssus" (Nero Bellum) – 1:26
 "Parasitic" (Bellum) – 4:53
 "Better Than Suicide" (Bellum, Eric Gottesman) – 5:10
 "Anaesthetic (For the Pathetic)" (Bellum, Josef Heresy) – 4:02
 "The Room" (Bellum) – 1:23
 "Flesh Harvest" (Bellum) – 4:21
 "Scar of the Deceiver" (Bellum, Heresy, Gottesman) – 4:03
 "Crwn Thy Frnicatr" (Bellum, Heresy) – 4:33
 "Visceral Holocaust" (Bellum, Gottesman) – 5:11
 "Proficiscor of Terminus Vicis" (Bellum) – 4:01
 "The Purging (A Revelation of Pain)" (Bellum, Gottesman) – 4:10/18:30
 "Evangelium Di Silenti (Track 0)" (Bellum) (hidden track in Metropolis Records release) – 4:45

In the Metropolis Records release, Evangelium di Silenti is an unlisted, hidden song that begins at 8:54 in The Purging (A Revelation of Pain) after 4:44 of silence rather than being a separate track.

Personnel
 Nero Bellum – vocals, guitar
 Josef Heresy – guitar, synthesizer
 Rotny Ford – guitar, synthesizer
 Filip Abbey – drums

Release history

Notes

Psyclon Nine albums
2006 albums